Ronald William Herbert Powell (2 December 1929 – 25 May 1992) was a footballer who played as a goalkeeper in the Football League between 1948 and 1964, and who played over 500 senior games.

He started with his home-town side Knighton Town, before transferring to Manchester City in November 1948, although he did not make his league debut until the following season. However, he only played 13 senior games for City in four years, and in the summer of 1952 he joined Chesterfield. All of his appearances for City came in the 1949–50 season, and he was in goals for the short period between the careers of Frank Swift and Bert Trautmann.

Powell missed only two league games in his first season with Chesterfield, and he went on to make 471 league appearances for them, and 508 matches in total, in a 12-year career with the club. In 1958 his run of playing 284 consecutive league games for the club was halted when Gordon Banks played. His playing career was ended in December 1964 following a car crash which killed his team-mate Ralph Hunt, and which also injured Doug Wragg and Peter Stringfellow.

References 

1929 births
1992 deaths
People from Radnorshire
Sportspeople from Powys
Association football goalkeepers
English Football League players
Knighton Town F.C. players
Manchester City F.C. players
Chesterfield F.C. players
Welsh footballers